Larinus pollinis is a species of cylindrical weevils belonging to the family Curculionidae, subfamily Lixinae.

Distribution
This species  is present in most of Europe (Austria, Bosnia and Herzegovina, Bulgaria, Croatia, Czech Republic, France, Germany, Hungary, Italy, Poland, Romania, Slovakia, Switzerland and Ukraine), in the East Palearctic realm, in North Africa, in the Oriental realm and in the Near East.  These weevils occur on Grasslands.

Description
These wevils have an ovate, black, sub-opaque body, with a with many patches of gray setae, that  appear yellowish by a yellowish secretion and adhering pollen. Rostrum is shorter than the thorax, with only a carina at the base.

Mature pupae show more than 40 setae on pronotum.

Biology
The adults can be encountered from May through August,  This  oligophagous species mainly feeds on Arctium tomentosum, Onopordon acanthium, Carlina vulgaris, etc.

References

Lixinae
Beetles of Europe
Beetles described in 1781
Taxa named by Johann Nepomuk von Laicharting